In chess, a transposition is a sequence of moves that results in a position which may also be reached by another, more common sequence of moves.  Transpositions are particularly common in the opening, where a given position may be reached by different sequences of moves. Players sometimes use transpositions deliberately, to avoid variations they dislike, lure opponents into unfamiliar or uncomfortable territory or simply to worry opponents. To transpose means to play move(s) that result in a transposition.

Transposition tables are an essential part of a computer chess program.

Transpositions exist in other abstract strategy games such as shogi, Go, tic-tac-toe and Hex.

Examples

Positions reached by different routes

For instance, the first position can be obtained from the Queen's Gambit:

1. d4 d5
2. c4 e6
3. Nc3 Nf6

But this position can also be reached from the English Opening:

1. c4 e6
2. Nc3 Nf6
3. d4 d5
so the English Opening has transposed into the Queen's Gambit.

The second position shows another example.  The position can arise from the French Defence:
1. e4 e6
2. d4 d5
3. exd5 exd5
4. Nf3 Nf6
The identical position can also be reached, with two extra moves played by each side, from the Petrov Defense:

1. e4 e5
2. Nf3 Nf6
3. Nxe5 d6
4. Nf3 Nxe4
5. d3 Nf6
6. d4 d5

This third position shows another example. This position can be reached from the Exchange variation of the Queen's Gambit Declined:
1. d4 d5
2. c4 e6
3. Nc3 Nf6
4. cxd4 exd4
5. Bg5 Bb4
6. Qc2 h6

The identical position can also be reached from the Classical variation of the Nimzo-Indian Defence:
1. d4 Nf6
2. c4 e6
3. Nc3 Bb4
4. Qc2 d5
5. cxd4 exd4
6. Bg5 h6

The fourth position shows another example.  The position can arise from the Sveshnikov variation of the Sicilian Defence:
1. e4 c5
2. Nf3 Nc6
3. d4 cxd4
4. Nxd4 Nf6
5. Nc3 e5
6. Ndb5 d6
7. Bg5 a6
8. Na3 b5
The identical position can also be reached, with one extra move played by each side, from the Four Knights variation of the Sicilian Defence:

1. e4 c5
2. Nf3 e6
3. d4 cxd4
4. Nxd4 Nf6
5. Nc3 Nc6
6. Bf4 d6
7. Ndb5 e5
8. Bg5 a6
9. Na3 b5

The position on the right, featuring a Maróczy Bind, can be reached from the Sicilian Defence:
1. e4 c5
2. Nf3 d6
3. d4 cxd4
4. Nxd4 g6
5. c4 Bg7
6. Nc3 Nf6
7. f3 Nc6
8. Be3 0-0

The identical position can also be reached from the King's Indian Defence:
1. d4 Nf6
2. c4 g6
3. Nc3 Bg7
4. e4 0-0
5. f3 d6
6. Be3 c5
7. Nge2 cxd4
8. Nxd4 Nc6

The position on the right can be reached from the Sicilian Defence:
1. e4 c5
2. Nf3 d6
3. d4 cxd4
4. Nxd4 Nf6
5. Nc3 g6
6. Nc3 Bg7
7. f3 a6
8. Qd2 h5
9. 0-0-0 Nbd7
10. Kb1 h5
11. h4 Bb7

The identical position can also be reached from the Pirc Defence:
1. e4 d6
2. d4 Nf6
3. Nc3 g6
4. Be3 Bg7
5. Qd2 a6
6. 0-0-0 b5
7. f3 Bb7
8. Nge2 Nbd7
9. Kb1 c5
10. h4 cxd5
11. Nxd4 h5

The position on the right can be reached from the Giuoco Piano:
1. e4 e5
2. Nf3 Nc6
3. Bc4 Bc5
4. d3 Nf6
5. c3 d6
6. 0-0 0-0
7. Nbd2 a6
8. Bb3 Ba7
9. h3 h6
10. Re1 Ne7
11. d4 exd4
12. cxd4 b5
13. Bc2 c5

The identical position can also be reached from the Berlin Defence:
1. e4 e5
2. Nf3 Nc6
3. Bb5 Nf6
4. d3 Bc5
5. c3 d6
6. 0-0 0-0
7. Nbd2 a6
8. Ba4 Ba7
9. h3 h6
10. Re1 Ne7
11. d4 exd4
12. cxd4 b5
13. Bc2 c5

The position on the right, featuring an isolani can be reached by many different openings and move orders.  For example, there's the Nimzo-Indian Defence:
1. d4 Nf6
2. c4 e6
3. Nc3 Bb4
4. e3 0-0
5. Bd3 c5
6. Nf3 cxd4
7. exd4 d5
8. 0-0 dxc4
9. Bxc4 Nc6
10. a3 Be7

Caro–Kann Defence:

1. e4 c6
2. d4 d5
3. exd5 cxd5
4. c4 Nf6
5. Nc3 e6
6. Nf3 Bb4
7. Bd3 dxc4
8. Bxc4 0-0
9. 0-0 Nc6
10. a3 Be7

Transposition possibilities of some openings
Some openings are noted for their wide range of possible transpositions, for example the Catalan Opening and  Sicilian Defence.

For a simple example, the opening moves 1.d4 e6 can transpose very quickly into a wide range of openings, including:

References

Chess terminology